Conor Corbett (born 1 March 2001) is an Irish Gaelic footballer who plays for Cork SAFC club Clyda Rovers and at inter-county level with the Cork senior football team. He usually lines out as a forward.

Career

Corbett played Gaelic football at school level with the Patrician Academy in Mallow. He won several titles with the school throughout 2019 and 2020, including the Simcox Cup. Corbett also lined out at juvenile and underage levels with the Clyda Rovers club before making his senior team debut in 2020. 

Corbett first lined out at inter-county level as captain of the Cork minor football team that beat Galway in the 2019 All-Ireland minor final. Corbett was subsequently named Minor Footballer of the Year. He was included on the Cork under-20 football team in 2020 and 2021, however, his progress onto the senior team was stalled after suffering a cruciate ligament injury. Corbett was included on the senior team's training panel in 2022.

Career statistics

Club

Inter-county

Honours

Patrician Adacemy
Simcox Cup: 2019
Munster Colleges Senior B Football Championship: 2020

Cork
Munster Under-20 Football Championship: 2021
All-Ireland Minor Football Championship: 2019 (c)

References

2001 births
Living people
Clyda Rovers Gaelic footballers
Cork inter-county Gaelic footballers
Sportspeople from Cork (city)